Frans-Albert Vaksal Schartau (13 July 1877 – 6 June 1943) was a Swedish sport shooter who competed at the 1908 and the 1912 Summer Olympics.

In 1908 he was a member of the Swedish team that won the silver medal in the team small-bore rifle competition. He also took part in the following events:
 Team pistol – fifth place
 disappearing target small-bore rifle – ninth place
 moving target small-bore rifle – did not finish
 individual pistol – 18th place

In 1912 he finished 18th in the 30 metre rapid fire pistol event.

References

1877 births
1943 deaths
Swedish male sport shooters
ISSF rifle shooters
ISSF pistol shooters
Olympic shooters of Sweden
Shooters at the 1908 Summer Olympics
Shooters at the 1912 Summer Olympics
Olympic silver medalists for Sweden
Olympic medalists in shooting
Medalists at the 1908 Summer Olympics
Swedish Army officers
People from Kristianstad Municipality
Sportspeople from Skåne County
19th-century Swedish people
20th-century Swedish people